The Carroll County Courthouse, Eastern District is a historic courthouse at Public Square in the center of Berryville, one of the county seats of Carroll County, Arkansas.  Built in 1881 and repeatedly enlarged, it is now a three-story brick structure with a truncated hip roof, and a pair of four-story towers at its front corners, which are topped by pyramidal roofs.  The courthouse was built shortly after Berryville replaced Carrollton as the county seat, and before Eureka Springs was chosen as the county's western seat.  The building now houses the Heritage Center Museum of the Carroll County Historical Society.

The building was listed on the National Register of Historic Places in 1976.

See also
National Register of Historic Places listings in Carroll County, Arkansas

References

External links
Carroll County Historic Society

Courthouses on the National Register of Historic Places in Arkansas
Government buildings completed in 1880
Buildings and structures in Berryville, Arkansas
Museums in Carroll County, Arkansas
History museums in Arkansas
National Register of Historic Places in Carroll County, Arkansas
Historic district contributing properties in Arkansas